Rubria may refer to:
 Rubria gens 
 Rubria (leafhopper), a genus of leafhoppers in the family Cicadellidae